Anthony DeVitis (born July 14, 1965) is a politician who was in the Ohio House of Representatives, representing the 36th District from his election in November 2012 until January 1, 2021. He was appointed to represent the 43rd District in December 2011, but he was placed in the 36th District after redistricting.

Life and career
Prior to serving in the House, DeVitis was a council member in Green, Ohio.  He is currently the co-owner of a real estate partnership, an Italian food distribution company, and an Italian retail store.

DeVitis is married and has two children, including current Green city council member Clark Anthony DeVitis.

Ohio House of Representatives
DeVitis was appointed in December 2011 to fill the vacancy caused by the resignation of Todd McKenney, who was appointed as Summit County Probate Court judge.

He is currently the state representative for Ohio's 36th District serving Summit County.  He is on the Insurance, Commerce, Labor, and Technology, and Transportation, Public Safety, and Homeland Security committees.

In 2012, DeVitis was elected to a full term over Democrat Paul Colavecchio with 52.66% of the vote.

In 2014, Devitis won reelection against Summit County Councilwoman Paula Prentice with 59.7% of the vote 

In 2015, DeVitis cosponsored the Fetal Heartbeat bill. The bill would ban all abortion in Ohio after 6 weeks, even in cases of rape or incest.

References

External links
Anthony DeVitis at the Ohio House of Representatives
Campaign website
 

Place of birth missing (living people)
Living people
Republican Party members of the Ohio House of Representatives
People from Green, Ohio
1969 births
University of Akron alumni
21st-century American politicians
Politicians from Akron, Ohio